The Clearwater River is a  tributary of the Red Lake River of Minnesota in the United States.  Via the Red Lake River, the Red River of the North, Lake Winnipeg, and the Nelson River, it is part of the Hudson Bay watershed.

"Clearwater" is an English translation of the native Ojibwe language name.

See also
List of rivers of Minnesota
List of longest streams of Minnesota

References

Minnesota Watersheds
USGS Hydrologic Unit Map - State of Minnesota (1974)

Rivers of Minnesota
Tributaries of Hudson Bay